This is a list of placenames in Scotland that have been applied to parts of Canada by Scottish emigrants or explorers.

For Nova Scotian names in Scottish Gaelic (not necessarily the same as the English versions) see Canadian communities with Scottish Gaelic speakers and Scottish Gaelic placenames in Canada

Note that, unless otherwise stated, province names are not Scottish.

Alberta

Airdrie
Alness
Alyth
Ardmore
Ardrossan
Banff - named after town in northeast Scotland
Bankhead (ghost town)
Barrhead
Blairmore
Bon Accord (Bon Accord is the motto of Aberdeen)
Bonnie Doon
Bonnie Lake
Broxburn
Butedale Falls
Caldwell (ghost town)
Calgary - Calgary, Mull
Canmore (named for King Malcolm Canmore)
Carstairs
Chisholm
Clyde
Colinton
Coutts
Craigmillar
Craigmyle
Cromdale
Dalmuir
Dunmore
Dunvegan - named after town on Isle of Skye
Eaglesham
Erskine
Ferintosh
Fort Macleod
Fort McMurray
Gartly
Halkirk (Halkirk)
Hazeldean
Holyrood (Holyrood)
Innisfail
Inverness River
Irvine
Islay
Kilsyth
Kirkcaldy
Kirriemuir
Lenzie
Lomond (Loch Lomond)
Mackenzie County
Mallaig
Mintlaw (ghost town)
Mount Hector (after James Hector)
Mount Lady Macdonald (after wife of John A. Macdonald)
New Stirling (Maybutt)
Pitlochrie
Scotfield
Stirling
Strathcona County
Strathcona

British Columbia

Abbotsford (location of Sir Walter Scott's house). Suburbs include Aberdeen and Glen Mountain.
Balfour (also known as "Balfour Bay")
Butedale (ghost town)
Cameron Bar 13
Cape Scott Provincial Park
Craigellachie
Coldstream
Cunningham Lake
Davidson, a settlement west of Prince Rupert, British Columbia
Duncan
Dundarave (West Vancouver)
Fintry Delta
Invermere (inbhir + mere)
Logan Lake
Montrose
Mount Brown (named after the Scottish botanist Robert Brown)
Mount Lyell (named by James Hector in 1858 for the Scottish geologist Sir Charles Lyell)
Mount Macdonald (after John A. Macdonald)
Stewart
Yarrow (River in Scottish Borders)

Manitoba
Angusville
Argyle, Manitoba
Carberry (named for Carberry Tower)
East Kildonan
Elgin
Elphinstone
Gretna
MacGregor
North Kildonan
Old Kildonan
Reston
Rossburn
Selkirk and  East Selkirk
St Andrews
West Kildonan

Rural municipalities:
Argyle
Armstrong
Cameron
Clanwilliam
Glenwood
Grahamdale
Lorne
Macdonald
Minto
Morton
Rossburn
St Andrews
Strathcona
Strathclair
Stuartburn

New Brunswick

Glenlevit
Glencoe
Dundee
Aberdeen
Atholville (Atholl)
Balmoral
Campbellton
Dalhousie
Drummond
Dumbarton Parish
Dumfries
Dundas Parish
Dundee
Elgin
Lower Kintore and Upper Kintore (Kintore)
Melrose
Minto
New Scotland
Perth-Andover
Port Elgin (Elgin)
Rothesay
St Andrews
Caledonia Mountain, New Brunswick

Newfoundland and Labrador

Anderson's Cove
Buchans and Lake Buchans
Campbell's Creek
Campbellton
Hamilton River
Highlands
Holyrood (Holyrood is the site of the current Scottish Parliament)
Iona
Loch Leven
Loch Lomond
Lomond
McKay's
Melrose
St. Andrew's

Northwest Territories
The Northwest Territories also contain three places with Scottish surnames: Fort Simpson, Fort McPherson and Rae (Although now collectively known with Edzo as Behchoko).

 Cameron River Volcanic Belt
 District of Mackenzie
 Ferguson Lake (Kitikmeot Region)
 Finlayson Islands
 Fort McPherson (Murdoch McPherson)
 Fort Simpson (George Simpson)
 Mackenzie Highway
 Mackenzie Mountains and Mackenzie River
 Macmillan Pass
 Melville Island (named for Robert Dundas, 2nd Viscount Melville)

Nova Scotia

"Nova Scotia" is Latin for New Scotland. Nova Scotia's Gaelic name is Alba Nuadh, which also literally means "New Scotland".

Aberdeen
Argyle
Arisaig
Ben Eoin (from the Scottish Gaelic for "mountain of the birds")
Beinn Bhreagh
Beinn Scalpie
Berwick
Boisdale
Broughton (ghost town)
Caledonia
Campbell
Clydesdale
Dundee
Dunvegan
Glencoe
Glendale
Granton
Inverness
Inverness County
Iona
Knoydart
Lismore
Lochaber
Loch Broom
Morar
Loch Lomond
New Edinburgh
New Gairlock
New Glasgow
New Ross
Portree
Scotch Village
Tantallon and Upper Tantallon

Nunavut

 Baillie-Hamilton Island
 Cameron Island
 Clyde Inlet and Clyde River
 Craig Harbour (on Ellesmere Island)
 Dundas Harbour
 Edinburgh Island (PIN-DA)
 Eglinton Island
 Graham Island
 Houston Stewart Island
 McConnell River Migratory Bird Sanctuary and McConnell River
 Mackar Inlet (CAM-5)
 Mackenzie hotspot and Mackenzie dike swarm
 Melville Island (named for Robert Dundas, 2nd Viscount Melville)
 Dundas Peninsula (part of Melville Island)
 Melville Peninsula
 Rankin Inlet
 Simpson Lake (CAM-D)

Ontario

Aberdeen, Grey County
Aberdeen, Prescott and Russell County
Aberfeldy
Aberfoyle
Achray
Ailsa Craig
Alloa
Angus
Angus Glen
Ardbeg
Ardoch
Armadale
Armstrong, Thunder Bay District
Armstrong Township, Armstrong Corners and Armstrong Mills
Arnprior
Arranvale (Isle of Arran)
Athol, Prince Edward County
Athol, Stormont, Dundas and Glengarry United Counties
Avonmore
Ayr
Ayton
Badenoch
Bainsville
Bairds
Ballantrae
Ballinafad
Bannockburn
Baxter
Bell Ewart
Berriedale (Berriedale, Sutherland)
Berwick
Bisset Creek
Bothwell
Boyds (Surname, derived from Bute)
Brechin
Bruce Mines
Bruce Peninsula
Bruce Station
Cairngorm
Caledon
Caledon East
Caledonia
Caledonia Springs
Callander
Campbellcroft
Campbellford
Campbellville
Cargill
Clachan
Cockburn Island
Coldstream
Colgan
Craigleith
Craigmont
Crieff
Cromarty
Crombie
Cruikshank
Dalhousie Lake
Dalhousie Mills
Dalkeith
Dalmeny
Dalrymple
Doon
Drummond
Dundas
Dundonald
Dunedin (Dunedin, poetic name for Edinburgh/Dun Eideann)
Dunkeld
Dunvegan
Dysart et al. (Dysart)
East Tay Point (Tay)
Elgin
Elgin County, Ontario
Farquhar
Fergus
Ferguslea
Ferguson Corners, Ferguson Falls and Fergusons Beach
Forfar
Galbraith
Gillies Hill
Gilmour
Glasgow
Glen
Glen Buell
Glenburn
Glenburnie
Glen Cross
Glenfield
Glen Huron
Glencairn
Glencoe
Glenelg Centre
Glen Major
Glen Nevis
Glenora
Glen Robertson
Glenview
Glenville
Glen Williams
Gorrie
Greenock
Haliburton
Hamilton
Hampden
Henderson
Innerkip
Inverary
Inverhuron (inbhir, meaning river mouth + Huron)
Invermay
Iona and Iona Station
Jura, Ontario
Katrine (Loch Katrine)
Kilsyth
Kinburn
Kincardine
Kinghorn
Kinmount
Kintail
Kirkfield
Laggan
Laird
Lake Dalrymple (Dalrymple)
Lamlash
Lammermoor
Lanark
Leith
Lochalsh, Algoma District
Lochalsh, Huron County
Lochwinnoch
Lowther
McAlpine Corners
Macdiarmid
MacDonald Bay
MacDonald's Grove
MacDuff
MacGillivrays Bridge
Mackenzie
MacKenzie Point
MacLarens Landing
MacLean Park
MacTier
Maitland, Huron County
Maitland, United Counties of Leeds and Grenville
Malcolm
Maxwell, Grey County
Maxwell, Hastings County
Maxwells
Minto
Moffat
Monteith
Moray
Morven
Nairn, Middlesex County
Nairn Centre
Napier
New Dundee
New Edinburgh
New Glasgow
New Scotland, Chatham-Kent
New Scotland, Regional Municipality of York
Paisley
Perth
Perth Road Village
Port Elgin
Raith
Rankin, Nipissing District
Rankin, Renfrew County
Rannoch
Ratho
Renfew, named for Renfrewshire
Renfrew Junction
Rutherford
Rutherglen
Scone
Scotch Bush, Hastings County and Scotch Bush, Renfrew County
Scotch Corners
Scotia
Selkirk
Speyside - Early settlers believed a local creek resembled the River Spey.
St. Andrews
Staffa, Perth County
 Strathroy, near London  
Stirling
Tarbert
Tartan
Tay
Tobermory, Ontario
Tweed
 Wallaceburg, Chatham-Kent (William Wallace)
West Elgin (Elgin)
West Lorne (Lorne)
Wick

Prince Edward Island

Breadalbane
Glenfinnan Island (Prince Edward Island) and Glenfinnan River
 Greenmount-Montrose
 Inverness
 Mount Stewart
 Lennox Island
 MacDonalds River
 Montrose River
 Murray River
 New Glasgow
 St Andrews

Quebec
Abercorn
Campbell's Bay
Denholm
Drummondville and Drummond RCM
Duncan Lake (Quebec)
Dundee
East Angus
Elgin
Hampden
Inverness
Lennoxville
Lochaber
Lochaber-Partie-Ouest
MacMasterville
MacNider
Napierville and Les Jardins de Napierville
Scotstown
Stornoway
Thurso
Tingwick

Saskatchewan

Aberdeen and Aberdeen No. 373
Abernethy and Abernethy No. 186
Ancrum
Argyle No. 1
Arran
Balcarres
Balgonie
Biggar
Birsay
Calder
Calderbank
Carmichael No. 109
Carnduff
Clansman
Colonsay and Colonsay No. 342
Crichton
Cupar
Dalmeny
Davidson
Dysart
Fairy Glen
Fife Lake
Girvin
Glen Ewen
Glenavon
Glenside
Govan
Inchkeith
Innes
Invergordon No. 430
Invermay
Isbister's Settlement (former name of Prince Albert)
Jedburgh
Kyle
Kylemore
Laird
Lomond No. 37
Lumsden and Lumsden No. 189
Markinch
Mortlach
Neidpath
Oban
Orkney and Orkney No. 244
Peebles
Ravenscrag
Saltcoats
Scotsguard
Simpson
St. Boswells
Tiree

The town of Coronach was originally named after a horse; however, the original meaning of coronach is a Gaelic lament.

Yukon

 Bell River
 Dawson City
 Fort Selkirk
 Mackenzie Mountains
 Mount Logan
Houston's Peak
 Mount Lorne
 Mount Macaulay
 Macmillan River
 Ogilvie Mountains
 Ogilvie River
 Robert Campbell Highway
 Ross River
 Stewart River

See also
 List of Spanish place names in Canada
 Locations in Canada with an English name

References

place names
Canada
Scottish
Scottish
Scottish